The RSP(L) was formed as a splinter group of the Revolutionary Socialist Party (RSP) in Kerala in 2016. The party leader at the time of its formation was Kovoor Kunjumon, formerly an important RSP leader in Kerala. RSP(L) is the part of CPI(M) led Left Democratic Front (LDF). The party won one seat (won by Kovoor Kunjumon) in the 2016 and 2021 Kerala Legislative Assembly election.

References

See also
 RSP MLA Kovoor Kunjumon

Communist parties in India
Political parties in Kerala
Political parties established in 2016
Revolutionary Socialist Party (India)
2016 establishments in Kerala